Caraquet is a provincial electoral district for the Legislative Assembly of New Brunswick, Canada. It was created in 1973 from Gloucester. The riding is centred on the town of Caraquet, extending west to Grande-Anse, New Brunswick and Saint-Léolin, New Brunswick and south to Paquetville, New Brunswick.

Members of the Legislative Assembly

Election results

References

External links 
Website of the Legislative Assembly of New Brunswick
Map of riding as of 2018

New Brunswick provincial electoral districts
Caraquet